This is a round-up of the 1998 Sligo Senior Football Championship. Eastern Harps atoned for the previous year's heavy defeat to Tourlestrane, reversing the result to win their fourth title. This was the last Championship to date to be played under the knockout system., as the round-robin section would be introduced for 1999.

First round

Quarter finals

Semi-finals

Sligo Senior Football Championship Final

References

 Sligo Champion (July–September 1998)

Sligo Senior Football Championship
Sligo Senior Football Championship